Cristian Villagrán (born 20 January 1982) is a Swiss-Argentine professional tennis player. He has a career-high ATP singles ranking of world No. 200 achieved on 7 July 2009, and a career-high ATP doubles ranking of world No. 115 achieved on 6 February 2006.

Villagran reached 28 career singles finals, posting a tally of 20 wins and 8 losses including a 1–2 record in ATP Challenger Tour finals. He won the 2006 Mantova Challenger tournament held on clay courts in Italy, where he defeated Giorgio Galimberti 6–2, 5-7, 6–4 in the final to win the championship. Additionally, he has also reached 28 career doubles finals with a record of 23 wins and 5 losses which includes a 7–1 record in ATP Challenger Tour finals.

Career

As a junior, Villagrán reached as high as world No. 13 in the singles rankings in 2000, as well as world No. 41 in doubles.

Villagran made his ATP Tour debut at the 2005 Buenos Aires tournament on clay courts in Argentina where he was granted a wild card entry into doubles main draw alongside compatriot Juan Pablo Brzezicki. They pulled off a major upset, defeating first seeds Gastón Etlis and Martín Rodríguez in the first round 2–6, 6-2, 6–3. They would continue their run by defeating Enzo Artoni and Ignacio González King in the second round 7–6(7–3), 2-6, 6–3 before finally being defeated in the semifinals by José Acasuso and Sebastián Prieto by a score of 6–7(8–10), 4-6 to end their impressive run. Two years later at the 2007 Buenos Aires Open he was given another wild card entry into the doubles draw, alongside Eduardo Schwank however they were defeated in the first round by Martin Garcia and Sebastian Prieto in three sets 4-6, 6–2, [12-14].

Personal life
Villagrán was born and raised in Argentina, but went to compete in a tennis tournament in Neuchâtel, Switzerland. There, he met his future wife and trainer, Pamela, who he married in 2008. He has since moved to Switzerland permanently, eventually becoming a citizen.

ATP Challenger and ITF Futures finals

Singles: 28 (20–8)

Doubles: 28 (23–5)

References

External links
 
 

Pan American Games medalists in tennis
Tennis players from Buenos Aires
1982 births
Living people
Swiss male tennis players
Argentine male tennis players
Swiss people of Argentine descent
Argentine emigrants to Switzerland
Pan American Games bronze medalists for Argentina
Argentine expatriate sportspeople in Switzerland
Tennis players at the 2003 Pan American Games
Medalists at the 2003 Pan American Games